Kathleen Tocke (born June 14, 1979) is an American sailor and world-class competitor in the 470, Snipe, 49er FX, Europe, RS:X and Laser Radial classes.

She competed in college with the Hobart and William Smith Colleges sailing team, and was a member of the US National Team in the Europe, RSX, and 49er FX classes and the US Pan American Games Team in the Snipe. In the Snipe class, she is a 2011 Pan American Games silver medalist; 2015 Pan American Games bronze medalist; Masters World Champion (2016); Western Hemisphere & Orient Champion (2018);  European Championship winner (2021); seven times North American Champion (2007, 2008, 2013, 2017, 2018, 2019, 2021); Women's European Champion (2019); and eight times United States National Champion (2003, 2008, 2009, 2010, 2011, 2019, 2021 and 2022).

References

External links
 
 

1978 births
Living people
American female sailors (sport)
Hobart and William Smith Statesmen and Heron sailors
Sailors at the 2011 Pan American Games
Medalists at the 2011 Pan American Games
Sailors at the 2015 Pan American Games
Medalists at the 2015 Pan American Games
Snipe class sailors
Sportspeople from Buffalo, New York
21st-century American women
Pan American Games silver medalists for the United States
Pan American Games bronze medalists for the United States
Pan American Games medalists in sailing